State Route 121 (SR 121) is a state highway in the U.S. state of California. It runs through the Wine Country region of Sonoma and Napa counties. Its southern terminus is at State Route 37 at Sears Point, and its northern terminus is at State Route 128 near Lake Berryessa. SR 121 passes through the Carneros region of the southern Sonoma Valley and Napa Valley.

Route description

The route begins at SR 37 in Sears Point, and then runs past the Tolay Lake basin and across Tolay Creek near Infineon Raceway. As it continues northward through Sonoma County, it meets SR 116, where it then veers east. SR 121 then enters Schellville, where it begins a short overlap with SR 12. Upon leaving, it begins another overlap with SR 29, which happens to be a freeway, in Napa County. When it leaves, it continues northward and meets SR 221 in Napa. As it leaves the city, it continues northward for several miles before reaching its north end at SR 128 near Lake Berryessa.

SR 121 is part of the California Freeway and Expressway System, but is not part of the National Highway System, a network of highways that are considered essential to the country's economy, defense, and mobility by the Federal Highway Administration. SR 121 is eligible to be included in the State Scenic Highway System, but it is not officially designated as a scenic highway by the California Department of Transportation. The California Legislature named the route Carneros Highway from its southern terminus to its junction with SR 29 in Napa, after the Carneros settlement. The stretch in Sonoma County between SR 37 and SR 116 runs along Arnold Drive, and along Fremont Drive between SR 116 and the Napa County line.

History
The section from SR 37 to SR 29 in Napa remains virtually unchanged since its definition in 1963. The northern section, however, was slightly altered since its definition the same year due to a realignment of various other freeways.

Major intersections

See also

References

External links

Caltrans: Route 121 highway conditions
California Highways: Route 121
California @ AARoads.com - State Route 121

State Route 121
State Route 121
121
Napa, California